The following elections occurred in the year 1872.

America

Canada
 1872 Canadian federal election

United States
 1872 New York state election
 1872 South Carolina gubernatorial election
 United States House of Representatives elections in California, 1872
 United States House of Representatives elections in South Carolina, 1872
 1872 and 1873 United States House of Representatives elections
 1872 United States presidential election
 1872 and 1873 United States Senate elections

Colombia
 presidential election

Europe  
 1872 Belgian general election
 1872 Danish Folketing election
 1872 Greek legislative election
 1872 Swedish general election
 1872 Swiss federal election
 United Kingdom: 
 1872 Aberdeen by-election
 1872 Bedfordshire by-election
 1872 Cork City by-election
 1872 Flint Boroughs by-election
 1872 Flintshire by-election
 1872 East Gloucestershire by-election
 1872 Galway County by-election
 1872 Kerry by-election
 1872 Kincardineshire by-election
 1872 Londonderry City by-election
 1872 Mallow by-election
 1872 North Nottinghamshire by-election
 1872 Northern West Riding of Yorkshire by-election
 1872 Oldham by-election
 1872 Pontefract by-election
 1872 Preston by-election
 1872 Richmond (Yorks) by-election
 1872 Southern West Riding of Yorkshire by-election
 1872 Tamworth by-election
 1872 Tiverton by-election
 1872 Wallingford by-election
 1872 West Cheshire by-election
 1872 West Cumberland by-election
 1872 Wexford Borough by-election
 1872 Wick Burghs by-election

Australia  
 1872 Mudgee colonial by-election
 1872 New South Wales colonial election
 1872 Parramatta colonial by-election

New Zealand  
 1872 City of Nelson by-election
 1872 Coleridge by-election
 1872 Rodney by-election
 1872 Waikato by-election
 1872 Waikouaiti by-election
 1872 Wakatipu by-election
 1872 Caversham by-election
 1872 Egmont by-election
 1872 Heathcote by-election
 1872 Wairau by-election

See also
 :Category:1872 elections

1872
Elections